The Borujerdi dialect (Persian: گویش بروجردی)‌ is a dialect of Luri language spoken in Borujerd city and its surrounding areas in the province of Lorestan in Iran. Borujerdi is more similar to Northern Luri than the Persian language, spoken in other parts of Lorestan, being in some aspects completely different.

Linguistic dependency
Ethnologue and Linguist List introduce Borujerdi as a Northern Luri dialect. Encyclopædia Iranica mentions Borujerd as one of the as one of the important centers of North Luri dialects. Dehkhoda Dictionary considers the language of Borujerd County's inhabitants as Persian Luri.

Notes

Lorestan Province
Borujerd